"Deed I Do" is a 1926 jazz standard composed by Fred Rose with lyrics by Walter Hirsch. It was introduced by vaudeville performer S. L. Stambaugh and popularized by Ben Bernie's recording. It was recorded by influential clarinetist and bandleader Benny Goodman as his debut recording in December 1926 with Ben Pollack and His Californians. Ruth Etting's rendition of the song became a top ten hit in 1927 as did the version by Johnny Marvin.

Other recorded versions 
 Matt Dusk and Margaret — Just the Two of Us (2015)
 Lena Horne with Luther Henderson's Orchestra (May 1948); reached No. 26 in the US charts.
Ella Fitzgerald and Count Basie on their 1963 album Ella and Basie.

See also 
 List of 1920s jazz standards

References

External links 
 List of artists who have performed Deed I Do"  at AllMusic

1926 songs
1920s jazz standards
2015 singles
Magic Records singles
Margaret (singer) songs
Songs with lyrics by Walter Hirsch
Songs written by Fred Rose (songwriter)